OTP Bank Group is the largest commercial bank of Hungary and one of the largest independent financial service providers in Central and Eastern Europe and  with banking services for private individuals and corporate clients. The OTP Group comprises subsidiaries in the field of insurance, real estate, factoring, leasing and asset management, investment and pension funds. The bank is present in 11 countries, namely Albania, Bulgaria, Croatia, Hungary, Moldova, Montenegro,  Romania,  Russia, Serbia, Slovenia and Ukraine. 

, OTP Group had more than 36,000 employees, 13 million clients, and over 1,500 branches. OTP is still the largest commercial bank in Hungary with over 25% market share.

OTP Group started its activity in 1949 when OTP Bank was founded as a state savings and commercial bank. OTP stands for Országos Takarék Pénztár, which indicates the original purpose of establishment of the bank. The bank went public in 1995, and the share of the state in the bank capital decreased to one preferential gold share, which also eliminated shortly thereafter. Currently most of the banks' shares are owned by private and institutional investors, which ensures stable ownership structure of the company. OTP has a high free float shareholder structure, with a free float ratio of 68.61%. The rest are held by Megdet Rahimkulov at 8.88%, Hungarian MOL Group at 8.57%, French Groupama at 8.3% and American Lazard at 5.64%.

History
The OTP Bank was established in 1949. The first predecessor of OTP Bank was the Pesti Hazai Első Takarékpénztár established in 1839. The predecessor of OTP Bank, called the National Savings Bank (OTP Bank) was established in 1949 as a nation-wide, state-owned, banking entity providing retail deposits and loans. Until 1987 the National Savings Bank was the only retail bank. Since 1989 the bank operated as a multi-functional commercial bank with the authorization to provide commercial loans and banking services for banks and import- export transactions.

In 1990, the National Savings Bank became a public company with a share capital of HUF 23 billion. Its name was changed to the National Savings and Commercial Bank. Subsequently, non-banking activities were separated from the bank, along with their supporting organisational units. The state lottery was reorganized into a separate state-owned company and OTP Real Estate was established as a subsidiary of the bank.

OTP Bank's privatization began in the year 1995. As a result of 3 public offers along with the introduction of the bank's shares into the Budapest Stock Exchange the state's ownership in the bank decreased to a single voting preference (golden) share. Currently the bank is characterized by dispersed ownership of mostly private and institutional (financial) investors.

After the realization of its own privatization process, OTP Bank started its international expansion targeting countries in Central and Eastern Europe.  OTP Bank has completed several acquisitions in the past years. Besides Hungary, OTP Group currently operates in 8 countries of the region via its subsidiaries: in Bulgaria (DSK Bank), in Croatia (OTP banka Hrvatska), in Romania (OTP Bank Romania), in Serbia (OTP Banka Srbija), in Slovakia (OTP Banka Slovensko), in Ukraine (OTP Bank JSC), in Montenegro (Crnogorska komercijalna banka) and in Russia (OAO OTP Bank). In March 2022, due to International sanctions during the Russo-Ukrainian War, OTP Bank stopped financing its Russian branch.

2008 was milestone in OTP Bank history since it was the first time to sell one of its subsidiaries. The French Groupama  S.A. acquired its insurance business line, and part of the transaction they resolved to collaborate in strategic points and cross sell their financial and insurance products.  Groupama S.A. has acquired 8% of shares of OTP Group.

In April 2014, it was announced that OTP Bank was close to a deal to acquire the Hungarian MKB Bank from German firm BayernLB. French Axa Bank Europe announced in February 2016 it has entered into an agreement with OTP Bank to sell its Hungarian banking operations, which is considered as medium-sized bank in Hungary.

In 2019, OTP Bank entered into an agreement to purchase MobiasBanca of Moldova. The agreement was finalized on 25 July 2019.

On December 12, 2022, in Tashkent, OTP Bank signed an agreement on the privatization of 75% of the Joint-Stock Commercial Mortgage Bank "Mortgage bank". It is planned to close the deal in the first half of 2023, the amount has not yet been disclosed.

OTP Group 

The Bank hosts an international organisation called the OTP group. The several parts of the group work in different areas of business.

Gallery

See also

European Banking Authority
List of banks
List of banks in Europe

References

External links

Banks established in 1949
Banks of Hungary
Companies based in Budapest
Companies listed on the Budapest Stock Exchange
1949 establishments in Hungary